In 2017, Hampshire County Cricket Club will compete in Division One of the County Championship, the Royal London One-Day Cup and the NatWest t20 Blast.

Squad

Departures
Left-arm medium bowler James Tomlinson and right-arm medium bowler Andy Carter both retired at the end of the 2016 season, although Carter later joined Northamptonshire. Wicket-keeper Adam Wheater left the club to join Essex in September 2016 after being released with a year left on his contract. South African all-rounder Ryan McLaren left Hampshire to join Lancashire in October 2016.
In March 2017, former England U19 captain Joe Weatherley signed a new contract with Hampshire. As part of this deal, he agreed to move on loan for the 2017 season to Kent, although he was recalled in August due to a spate of injuries. Fast bowlers Gareth Andrew, Tino Best and Yasir Arafat (who had been on loan at Somerset in 2016) all were released after short term deals, along with David Wainwright. Gavin Griffiths who had been on loan at the club, joined Leicestershire, while Craig Young did not have his loan extended either. Overseas player Darren Sammy will not be returning in 2017. In late August, Michael Carberry was loaned to Leicestershire for first-class cricket.

Arrivals
In September 2017, Hampshire signed young all-rounder Asher Hart from Durham's academy. In October 2016, young all-rounder Fraser Hay was awarded a summer contract for 2017, having impressed in the academy.
In January 2017, South Africans Kyle Abbott and Rilee Rossouw both quit international cricket and subsequently signed for Hampshire on Kolpak contracts. George Bailey returned to the side on a two-year deal as overseas player, having previously played for the club as overseas in the 2013 season. Australian Ian Holland also joined the club during April, having played for the Second XI during the 2016 and early 2017 season. Youngsters Calvin Dickinson, Ben Duggan, Jake Goodwin and Josh McCoy all signed Hampshire scholarships with the side for the 2017 season after their performances for the Academy and Second XI, while Felix Organ, on an academy contract, represented the first team in September. Former Essex bowler Matt Salisbury joined the club on trial following some impressive performances in the Second XI. Wiltshire spinner Jake Lintott joined the team in August while Mason Crane was on international duty.

Squad list
 No. denotes the player's squad number, as worn on the back of their shirt.
  denotes players with international caps.
  denotes a player who has been awarded a county cap.

Squad information correct as of 17 August 2017

County Championship

Hampshire will play 14 County Championship Division One matches in 2017. The Championship has been restructured for 2017, with Division One having eight teams, leaving the remaining ten counties in Division Two instead of the previous nine-nine split. Teams in both divisions will play fewer matches than in 2016 (14 instead of 16), meaning that teams in Division One will play all of their rivals twice.

Hampshire's opening fixture was away against Yorkshire at Headingley Cricket Ground, which they won by 4 wickets after successfully chasing 320. They will then play seven home matches in total at the Rose Bowl. One fixture, a home game against Somerset, will be a day–night match, part of an experiment by the England and Wales Cricket Board ahead of the staging of the first UK day–night test match in August.

Division One

Matches

Other first-class matches
Hampshire began the 2017 English cricket season with a three-day University match against Cardiff MCC University on 2 April. They will also play South Africa A in a day night match on 8 June.

Royal London One-Day Cup

Hampshire will play in the South group of the 2017 Royal London One-Day Cup. They will play each of the other eight teams in the group once.

South Group

Matches

NatWest t20 Blast

Hampshire will play in the South group of the 2017 NatWest t20 Blast. The county will play 14 matches, playing each team in the group at least once.

South Group

Matches

Quarter-final

As a result of Hampshire finishing in the top 4 of the South Group, they qualified for the quarter finals. They will play Derbyshire on 22 August with the winner qualifying for Finals Day.

Finals Day

As a result of winning their Quarter Final, Hampshire advanced to Finals Day to be held at Edgbaston on 2 September. After the 4th quarter final it was confirmed that Hampshire had been drawn against Nottinghamshire in the second semi-final.

Statistics

Batting

First-class

 — Source: CricInfo

List A

 — Source: CricInfo

Twenty20

 — Source: CricInfo

Bowling

First-class

 — Source: CricInfo

List A

 — Source: CricInfo

Twenty20

 — Source: CricInfo

References

External links
Hampshire home at ESPN Cricinfo
Hampshire County Cricket Club official site

2017
2017 in English cricket